The American Indian Philosophy Association (AIPA) is an organization whose purpose is to promote and further the study of philosophical issues that affect American Indigenous people.

External links 
AIPA website

Philosophy organizations
Native American organizations